Begoniaceae is a family of flowering plants with two genera and about 2040 species occurring in the subtropics and tropics of both the New World and Old World. All but one of the species are in the genus Begonia. There have been many recent discoveries of species in the genus Begonia, such as Begonia truncatifolia which is endemic to San Vincente, Palawan. B. truncatifolia is smaller in size than other species of the genus Begonia and this new species is proposed Critically Endangered by standards set by the IUCN. The only other genus in the family, Hillebrandia, is endemic to the Hawaiian Islands and has a single species. Phylogenetic work supports Hillebrandia as the sister taxon to the rest of the family. The genus Symbegonia was reduced to a section of Begonia in 2003, as molecular phylogenies had shown it to be derived from within that genus. Members of the genus Begonia are well-known and popular houseplants.

Characteristics
Begonias, particularly double begonias, have similarities to roses and have been called "Roseform Roses" or simply referred to as a type of rose.

References

Further reading

External links

 
Rosid families